Merragata brunnea is a species of velvet water bug in the family Hebridae. It is found in North America.

References

Further reading

 
 

Articles created by Qbugbot
Insects described in 1917
Hebroidea